Ø Choir (stylized as Ø CHOIR) is Uverworld's eight studio album. It was released on July 2, 2014 and there are a total of 14 tracks on the album. This is the first album that will include their sixth member Seika, who was before a support member for UVERworld over these years. Seika saxophone plays was also featured for some of the remakes of their album songs.

The album will contain "Fight For Liberty" which was used as the opening theme song for the anime series Space Battleship Yamato 2199 and "Wizard CLUB" used as the ending theme song for the TV series Kaikin! Bakuro Night. Plus with the other additional singles released in 2014 "Nano-Second (ナノ・セカンド)" and "Nanokame no Ketsui (7日目の決意)" will also be added to the album. For the first time in their history that the band has decided to add a cover song to the album "Born Slippy" from Underworld.

The limited edition will come with the full 120-minute video footage "core ability 3" and 18 commercials of "John & Bob spot patterns". The album will also enclose a 24-page special booklet.

Track listing

References

2014 albums
Uverworld albums
Gr8! Records albums
Japanese-language albums